The Central Institute of Classical Tamil (CICT) is a body established by the Government of India with a view to promoting the cause of Classical Tamil. It is located in Chennai.

History
The CICT was formerly known as the Centre of Excellence for Classical Tamil (CECT) and had been functioning at the Central Institute of Indian Languages, Mysore, a branch of the Department of Higher Education, Language Bureau, Ministry of Human Resource Development. In May 2008, the CECT was moved to Chennai and was rechristened as the Central Institute of Classical Tamil (CICT). The chairman of the new institute was the then Chief Minister of Tamil Nadu M. Karunanidhi. The governing body for Classical Tamil Institute (TLPB) was also changed as Aimperumkuzhu (literally "5-membered great team") and Enperayam (literally "8-membered great committee") under two vice-chairmen, V. I. Subramoniam and V. C. Kulandaiswamy, with the chairman for this governing body being M. Karunanidhi.

In 2012, the CITC published the only Meitei translation of the Kural. The work was undertaken by Soibam Rebika Devi, a botanist, linguist, and translator from Imphal, Manipur, who translated the complete work in prose form. The translation was completed in about a year and a half's time. It is considered the first ever translation of a Tamil work into the Meitei language. The translation was part of CICT's project of translating the Kural into multiple languages including Telugu, Kannada, Nepali, Punjabi and other Indian languages. The translation was officially released in Imphal in March 2014 by the governor of Manipur. In November 2014, the CICT planned to recite the Meitei translation along with translations in 9 other languages to commemorate the launch of the institution's Telugu and Kannada translations of the Kural text.

Premises
Since May 2012, the CICT was functioning from the premises of Road Transport Corporation at Taramani. The government acquired a land at Perumbakkam and a fund of  246.547 million was allotted in 2017 to construct a building.

Since 2022, the CICT functions from its own building at Perumbakkam, a southern neighbourhood of Chennai. Built at a cost of  246.5 million on a 16.86-acre land, the four-storied building has a total built-up area of 70,000 square feet. The building houses a library and conference halls on the ground floor, office of the director and administrative offices on the first floor, offices of the academic staff on the second floor, and multimedia center on the third floor. As of 2022, the CICT has 22 academic staff and 23 non-academic staff.

Functions
The CICT is engaged in the task of developing Tamil through various programmes of its own. The Institute is responsible for the Kural Peedam Award.

Projects

The following are the ten major projects of The Centre of Excellence for Classical Tamil (CECT):

 Definitive Editions of Ancient Tamil Works 
 Translation of Ancient Tamil Works 
 Historical Grammar of Tamil 
 Antiquity of Tamil: An Inter-Disciplinary Research 
 Synchronic And Diachronic Study of Tamil Dialects 
 India As a Linguistic Area 
 Digital Library For Ancient Tamil Studies 
 Online Teaching of Classical Tamil 
 Corpus Development For Classical Tamil Works 
 Visual Episodes on Classical Tamil

The Tamil Language Promotion Board (TLPB) has been changed as Aimpermkuzhu and Enperayam, with the board reconstituted.

See also
 International Institute of Tamil Studies

References

Further reading
CICT Project Notification: 
Architectural Consultancy http://www.creative-arch.com/index.php?option=com_content&view=article&id=97&Itemid=176
CICT Project Location http://wikimapia.org/18338824/Central-Institute-of-Classical-Tamil

External links 
Official Website

Tamil language
Ministry of Education (India)
Language education in India
Language advocacy organizations
Linguistic research in India
Tamil-language education
Research institutes in Chennai
Year of establishment missing